Postplatyptilia palmeri is a moth of the family Pterophoridae. It is known from Mexico.

The wingspan is about 14 mm. Adults are on wing in December.

References

palmeri
Moths described in 1996